"Someone to Call My Lover" is a song by American singer-songwriter Janet Jackson from her seventh studio album, All for You (2001). Written and produced by Jackson and Jimmy Jam and Terry Lewis, the song was released as the album's second single on June 12, 2001, by Virgin Records. Using a guitar riff from America's "Ventura Highway" and the melody from Erik Satie's "Gymnopédie No. 1", "Someone to Call My Lover" talks about being determined to find a perfect match.

"Someone to Call My Lover" received positive reviews from critics, with most praising its innocence and sweet aura, picking the song as a standout track on the album. The song was a success on the charts, reaching number three on the US Billboard Hot 100 while peaking at number nine in Canada and the top twenty in Australia, New Zealand and the United Kingdom. A music video was directed by Francis Lawrence and centers on a jukebox. Another video for the "So So Def" remix was also released. Jackson has performed the song on two of her tours, most recently on her 2017 State of the World Tour.

Background and writing
"Someone to Call My Lover" was written and produced by Janet Jackson, James Harris III and Terry Lewis. The song's looped guitar riff is sampled from America's 1972 hit "Ventura Highway", with Dewey Bunnell receiving writing credits. The loop played throughout the chorus is an interpolation of "Gymnopédie No. 1" by French classical composer Erik Satie, played in 4/4 time instead of the original 3/4. Jackson had searched for years for the catchy Satie track. When I was a little girl and I used to come home from school, there was something called "The 3:30 Movie", and they used to play the MGM Musicals. There was a commercial. I remember watching Singin' in the Rain and there was a commercial with the lady all in white, and I don't know if it was for Dove or something like that, but they would play this, 'Da, da, da.' It was the Erik Satie. I never knew who the composer was, and this song never left me.

Jackson said she came across the tune again about seven years later: "I was at Ralph Lauren and I said, 'Oh, my God! Is this the radio or is this a CD?' I said, 'Please tell me it's a CD.' They said, 'It's a CD—well, actually it's a Ralph Lauren CD and we don't have it anymore. I was like, 'Oh God...no,' and they gave me the CD." Jackson said, "I took it straight to Jimmy [Jam] and said, 'Jimmy, I've just got to share this with you,' and he saw my passion and my love for it. He didn't take the actual song, but he kind of put his own flavor to it in 'Someone To Call My Lover,' which takes me back to my childhood." In an interview, Jimmy said, "And for 'Someone to Call My Lover,' she hadn't heard the 'Ventura Highway' sample before. She hadn't heard those songs. So it's kind of fun to come up with stuff like that and play it for her. And she hasn't heard of it, but she still really likes it. So you have something that's going to appeal to people that haven't heard it before, it's going to catch them, but it's also going to catch the people who are nostalgic about it."

Composition and music
At the time of recording, Jackson was in a divorce battle with her husband, René Elizondo Jr., after nearly ten years of marriage. "Someone to Call My Lover", and several of the other songs on All for You, use Jackson's divorce and re-emergence into single life as central themes. "Someone to Call My Lover" talks about being determined to find a perfect match. The sample of America's "Ventura Highway" opens the single, accompanied by finger snaps and bass. In the beginning, Jackson has begun touring again and there isn't anyone to talk to and she wishes she had companionship, "Back on the road again/Feeling kinda lonely/And looking for the right guy/To be mine," she sings.

In the pre-chorus, she fantasizes where her dream guy might be, "Maybe we'll meet at a bar / He'll drive a funky car / Maybe we'll meet at a club / And fall so deeply in love," she sings. In the chorus, she's eager to find a guy to love, "Alright, maybe gonna find him today / I gotta get someone to call my lover / Yeah, baby, come on," she chants.

"Someone to Call My Lover" is written in the key of D major with a moderately fast tempo of 128 beats per minute. The song follows a chord progression of Dmaj7–G6–Dmaj7–G6, and Jackson's vocals span from the low note A3 to the high note B4.

Critical reception
"Someone to Call My Lover" received generally favorable reviews from music critics. Stephen Thomas Erlewine from AllMusic picked the song as "one of the record's best cuts". Timothy Park of NME enjoyed the lyrics, writing that "while most of us dream of being Janet, it's reassuring to know she dreams of being us. And providing she does it with the ever-enduring Jam & Lewis produced fluffy pop of 'Someone To Call My Lover' then who are we to complain?." In another NME review, Piers Martin wrote that the song "recalls Aaliyah's 'Try Again' in its squelchy simplicity." Gene Stout of Seattle Post-Intelligencer praised the track, calling it "sweetly innocent", praising the "Ventura Highway guitar," writing that it "adds a wistful, nostalgic feel to the song's deep yearnings for love and togethernesss."

According to Chuck Arnold from Entertainment Weekly, "Although she has yet to find someone to call her lover, the mood is irrepressibly upbeat and optimistic about pre-Tinder match-meeting".

Chart performance
The song was released as the second single from All for You, following the huge success of its title track. It is the last of Jackson's singles to have reached the top 10 on the Billboard Hot 100 chart to date. On the Billboard Hot 100 chart, "Someone to Call My Lover" reached the top 40 in June, while it reached the top 10 in July. It eventually peaked at number three, becoming Jackson's 27th and last top-10 hit. It also debuted at number one on the Hot 100 Singles Sales chart, where it remained for three weeks. It also topped the R&B/Hip-Hop Singles Sales chart for two weeks. The song reached number nine on the Canadian Hot 100 chart. "Someone to Call My Lover" reached the top 20 in many places. In the United Kingdom, the song reached number 11 on the UK Singles Chart In Australia, the song debuted and peaked at number 15 on the ARIA Singles Chart week of August 5, 2001, spending nine weeks on the chart, while on the New Zealand Singles Chart, the song debuted at number 30 and peaked at number 18 in its fourth week, spending a total of 15 weeks on the chart.

Remixes and accolades
For the single, a So So Def Remix was produced and became Jackson's first collaboration with Jermaine Dupri. The song earned Jackson a Grammy Award nomination for Best Female Pop Vocal Performance in 2002, losing out to Nelly Furtado's "I'm Like a Bird".

Music video
The music video was directed by Francis Lawrence, and centres on a jukebox. Jackson is depicted driving and walking into a bar, where she sings, dances and eventually hitches a ride from a red car. A video for the So So Def Remix was also released, and contains similar footage to the original but contains shots of Dupri in alternate scenes as well as his vocals. The original video made the limited bonus-DVD edition of All for You while the So So Def Remix video appears on the 2004 video compilation From Janet to Damita Jo: The Videos.

Live performances
Jackson has performed "Someone to Call My Lover" on two of her tours. The song was added to the setlist of her All for You Tour, as one of the last songs on the show. During the performance, the singer wore a white T-shirt and jeans, while using a garland of flowers, called Lei in Hawaii. The February 16, 2002, final date of the tour at the Aloha Stadium in Hawaii, was broadcast by HBO. This rendition was also added to the setlist at its DVD release, Janet: Live in Hawaii, in 2002. "Someone To Call My Lover" was also the video dedication song to Singapore for the 2011 Number Ones, Up Close and Personal tour. It was also performed on her 2017 State of the World Tour in place of "Island Life" at several shows, including in Cleveland on December 3, and Memphis on December 6, 2017.

Track listings

US CD single 
 "Someone to Call My Lover" (So So Def remix) – 4:40
 "Someone to Call My Lover" (single edit) – 4:14

US 12-inch single 
A1. "Someone to Call My Lover" (So So Def remix) – 4:40
A2. "Someone to Call My Lover" (Hex Hector/Mac Quayle radio mix) – 3:49
B1. "Someone to Call My Lover" (album version)

UK CD single 
 "Someone to Call My Lover" (single edit) – 4:14
 "Someone to Call My Lover" (Hex Hector/Mac Quayle club mix) – 7:48
 "Someone to Call My Lover" (So So Def remix) – 4:40
 "Someone to Call My Lover" (video)

UK 12-inch single 
A1. "Someone to Call My Lover" (Hex Hector/Mac Quayle club mix) – 7:48
B1. "Someone to Call My Lover" (So So Def remix) – 4:40
B2. "Someone to Call My Lover" (The Velvet mix) – 4:46

UK cassette single 
 "Someone to Call My Lover" (single edit) – 4:14
 "Someone to Call My Lover" (Hex Hector/Mac Quayle club mix) – 7:48
 "Someone to Call My Lover" (So So Def remix) – 4:40

European CD single 
 "Someone to Call My Lover" (single edit) – 4:14
 "Someone to Call My Lover" (So So Def remix) – 4:40

Australasian and Japanese CD single 
 "Someone to Call My Lover" (single edit) – 4:14
 "Someone to Call My Lover" (Hex Hector/Mac Quayle radio edit) – 3:49
 "Someone to Call My Lover" (So So Def remix) – 4:40
 "Someone to Call My Lover" (Velvet mix) – 4:46
 "Someone to Call My Lover" (Hex Hector/Mac Quayle club mix) – 7:48

Credits and personnel
Credits are lifted from the All for You album booklet.

Studios
 Recorded and mixed at Flyte Tyme Studios (Edina, Minnesota)
 Mastered at Bernie Grundman Mastering (Hollywood, California)

Personnel

 Janet Jackson – writing, all vocals, production
 Jimmy Jam – writing (James Harris III), all additional instruments, production
 Terry Lewis – writing, all additional instruments, production
 Dewey Bunnell – writing
 David Barry – guitar
 Alex Richbourg – drum and MIDI programming
 Steve Hodge – recording, mixing
 Brad Yost – recording and mixing assistant
 Xavier Smith – recording and mixing assistant
 Brian "Big Bass" Gardner – mastering
 Mike Bozzi – mastering assistant

Charts

Weekly charts

Year-end charts

Certifications and sales

|}

Release history

See also
 List of number-one dance singles of 2001 (U.S.)

References

2000 songs
2001 singles
Janet Jackson songs
Media containing Gymnopedies
Music videos directed by Francis Lawrence
Song recordings produced by Jimmy Jam and Terry Lewis
Songs written by Dewey Bunnell
Songs written by Janet Jackson
Songs written by Jimmy Jam and Terry Lewis
Virgin Records singles